The Spirit of Nature Wood Architecture Award was an international architecture award, awarded every two years, from 2000 until 2012, when it was discontinued. The award was founded by the Wood in Culture Association (Puu kulttuurissa ry), a Finnish association sponsored by the Finnish wood industry.  The award is given to a person or group of persons  whose work exemplifies a progressive and creative use of wood. The prize money was €40,000. The award was made at a ceremony held at the Sibelius Hall in the city of Lahti. The award was given a total of seven times. A few of the award winners afterwards received commissions to design a small structure in Lahti.

Recipients of the Spirit of Nature Wood Architecture Award

Structures in Lahti designed by Spirit of Nature Wood Architecture Award recipients

See also
 List of architecture awards

References

Architecture awards
Awards established in 2000